Calocosmus is a genus of longhorn beetles of the subfamily Lamiinae, containing the following species:

 Calocosmus chevrolati Fisher, 1925
 Calocosmus contortus Lingafelter, 2013
 Calocosmus dimidiatus (Chevrolat in Guérin-Méneville, 1838)
 Calocosmus fulvicollis Fisher, 1925
 Calocosmus hispaniolae Fisher, 1925
 Calocosmus janus Bates, 1881
 Calocosmus magnificus Fisher, 1932
 Calocosmus marginipennis Gahan, 1889
 Calocosmus melanurus Gahan, 1889
 Calocosmus nigripennis Chevrolat, 1862
 Calocosmus nigritarsis Fisher, 1942
 Calocosmus nuptus Chevrolat, 1862
 Calocosmus punctatus Lingafelter, 2013
 Calocosmus rawlinsi Lingafelter, 2013
 Calocosmus robustus Lingafelter, 2013
 Calocosmus semimarginatus Bates, 1881
 Calocosmus speciosus Chevrolat, 1862
 Calocosmus venustus (Chevrolat in Guérin-Méneville, 1838)

References

 
Hemilophini